Leopoldov (before 1948 Mestečko;) is a town in the Trnava Region of Slovakia, near the Váh river. It has a population of around 4,000 inhabitants. The city is the location of Leopoldov Prison, a high-security correctional institution.

History
The town was founded in 1664-1669 as a fortress against the Ottoman Turks on the initiative of Emperor Leopold I (hence the name). It was granted town status in 1669. The fortress has served as a state prison since 1855. A village called "Leopold" (German also: Leopoldstadt, Hungarian since 1873: Lipótvár) was made part of Leopoldov in 1882. In modern Slovakia, Leopoldov is an important transfer point of railway tracks.

Leopoldov was founded on fields of old villages of Červeník (former 'Verešvár') and Šulekovo (former Beregsek).

Partner towns

  Kuřim, Czech Republic
  Fertőszentmiklós, Hungary

Gallery

References

External links
 Official website 

Cities and towns in Slovakia
Populated places established in the 1660s
Hlohovec District